Mancuso is an Italian surname derived from a Sicilian noun, related to the Italian mancino, which means "left-handed". An alternate form can be Mancusi. Notable people with the surname include:

 Alejandro Mancuso, retired Argentine footballer
Anna Mancuso, Canadian former politician
Ciro Mancuso, Nevada-based drug dealer convicted of running a $140-million marijuana smuggling operation
David Mancuso, American DJ
Filippo Mancuso, Italian judge and politician
Francis Xavier Mancuso, Leader of Tammany Hall and a judge for New York's Court of General Sessions
Frank Mancuso Jr., movie producer
Gus Mancuso, catcher in Major League Baseball from 1928 to 1945
Julia Mancuso, American alpine skier who won a gold medal at the 2006 Winter Olympics
Laurence Mancuso, founding abbot of the New Skete monastery
Leonardo Mancuso, Italian footballer
Nick Mancuso, Italian-Canadian cinema and stage actor
Renee Mancuso, American bridge player
Rudy Mancuso, American actor and Internet personality and musician
Salvatore Mancuso, Colombian paramilitary warlord
The fictional character Nick Mancuso, played by Robert Loggia in Favorite Son (1988) and Mancuso, F.B.I. (1989)
The fictional character Angelo Mancuso in the novel A Confederacy of Dunces (1980)
The fictional character Bart Mancuso, played by Scott Glenn in The Hunt for Red October (1990)

Surnames of Italian origin